The First ARMM Regional Legislative Assembly was a meeting of the unicameral regional legislature of the Autonomous Region in Muslim Mindanao.

Members

See also 
 Autonomous Region in Muslim Mindanao
 ARMM Regional Legislative Assembly

References 

ARMM Regional Legislative Assembly by legislative period